Lawrence Seeff (born 1 May 1959) is a former South African first-class cricketer.

He played with Western Province and Transvaal and was one of the South African Cricket Annual's Cricketers of the Year in 1981. He opened the batting for Western Province with his brother Jonathan Seeff.

Seeff, who is Jewish, played in the Maccabiah for South Africa in 1993, along with Terrence Lazard.

See also
List of select Jewish cricketers

References 

1959 births
Living people
South African cricketers
Western Province cricketers
Gauteng cricketers
Jewish cricketers
Jewish South African sportspeople
Maccabiah Games cricketers